Glenny Sofía Cepeda Gabriel (born 13 April 1981) is a Dominican former tennis player.

A native of San Pedro de Macorís, Cepeda earned ITA All-American honours as a collegiate tennis player for Shorter University, where she also competed on the volleyball team. She was a 2011 inductee to the Shorter University Athletic Hall of Fame, for her contributions to both sports.

Cepeda was a regular member of the Dominican Republic Fed Cup team from 1996 to 2002, later playing a further year in 2014. She helped her side qualify for Group I of the Americas Zone in 2000 and appeared in a total of 34 ties during her career. Her 21 wins in doubles rubbers set a team record.

Outside of the Fed Cup, Cepeda also represented the Dominican Republic at the 1998 Central American and Caribbean Games, 2002 Central American and Caribbean Games and 2003 Pan American Games.

References

External links
 
 
 

1981 births
Living people
Dominican Republic female tennis players
Pan American Games competitors for the Dominican Republic
Tennis players at the 2003 Pan American Games
Shorter Hawks athletes
College women's tennis players in the United States
Sportspeople from San Pedro de Macorís
Competitors at the 1998 Central American and Caribbean Games
Competitors at the 2002 Central American and Caribbean Games
Central American and Caribbean Games bronze medalists for the Dominican Republic
Central American and Caribbean Games medalists in tennis